The men's 5000 metres event at the 2015 Summer Universiade was held on 10 and 12 July at the Gwangju Universiade Main Stadium.

Medalists

Results

Heats
Qualification: First 5 in each heat (Q) and next 5 fastest (q) qualified for the semifinals.

Final

References

5000
2015